NorthStone Country Club is a private club located in Huntersville, North Carolina in the center of NorthStone housing community. The P.B. Dye signature course was rated "Number One" by Charlotte's Business Journal. The club launched the Academy of Golf at NorthStone in 2001. The Academy features an indoor/outdoor hitting facility complete with video, training aids and golf-specific fitness equipment. NorthStone Country Club offers members four swimming pools, three Plexi-pave tennis courts, children's play center and picnic area. NorthStone offers a number of children's programs including summer camps, Nike Junior Golf School, junior golf and tennis clinics, swim team and swim lessons, and a variety of teen activities.

References

Golf clubs and courses in North Carolina
Sports venues in Mecklenburg County, North Carolina